Suburbs of Geraldton, Western Australia

 Beachlands
 Beresford
 Bluff Point
 Cape Burney
 Deepdale
 Drummond Cove
 Geraldton
 Glenfield
 Karloo
 Mahomets Flats
 Meru
 Moresby
 Mount Tarcoola
 Narngulu
 Rangeway
 Rudds Gully
 Spalding
 Strathalbyn
 Sunset Beach
 Tarcoola Beach
 Utakarra
 Waggrakine
 Wandina
 Webberton
 West End
 Wonthella
 Woorree